The Experimental Cinema of the Philippines (ECP) was a government-owned corporation of the Republic of the Philippines created to promote the growth and development of the local film industry. Created in 1982 after the first Manila International Film Festival through Executive Order 770, the ECP was primarily known as a production company.  However, it was created among other things; to hold the Manila International Film Festival, to manage the Manila Film Center, administer a film rating and classification system and to establish and operate the National Film Archive. It was also mandated to provide financial assistance to select motion pictures through a film fund.

For purposes of policy coordination, it was placed under the Ministry of Tourism. While its initial films were critically acclaimed, the ECP was accused of producing sex-oriented or "Bomba" films later in its history until it was dissolved in 1986.

From the official documents, the Experimental Cinema of the Philippines formally ceased its operations through the Executive Order No. 1051.

Filmography

See also
Cultural Center of the Philippines
Movie and Television Review and Classification Board
Cinema Evaluation Board of the Philippines
Manila Film Center

References and External Links

Companies established in 1982
Companies disestablished in 1985
Film production companies of the Philippines
State-owned film companies
1982 establishments in the Philippines
1985 disestablishments in the Philippines
Establishments by Philippine executive order